Thalassometridae is a family of echinoderms belonging to the order Comatulida.

Genera

Genera:
 Aglaometra Clark, 1913
 Cosmiometra Clark, 1909
 Crotalometra Clark, 1909

References

Comatulida